Wartislaw VI of Pomerania (1345 – 13 June 1394) was a member of the House of Griffins.  From 1365 to 1377, he ruled Pomerania-Wolgast jointly with his brother Bogislaw VI.  From 1377 until his death, he was the sole ruler of Pomerania-Barth.

Life 

He was the eldest son of the Duke Barnim IV of Pomerania-Wolgast-Rügen and his wife, Sophie of Werle.

After the death of his father Barnim IV in 1365, Pomerania-Wolgast was divided in the 1372 Treaty of Anklam into the eastern Duchy of Pomerania-Stolp (from the Swine River to the Leba River), ruled by his uncle Bogislaw V and the western Duchy of Pomerania-Wolgast, ruled jointly by Wartislaw VI and his younger brother Bogislaw VI.  In 1377, Pomerania-Wolgast was divided into a smaller Pomerania-Wolgast, ruled by Bogislaw VI, and Pomerania-Barth ruled by Wartislaw VI.  In 1396, Bogislaw VI died at Klępino Białogardzkie, without a male heir, and the two parts of Pomerania-Wolgast were reunited under Wartislaw VI.

Marriage and issue 
He married Anne of Mecklenburg-Stargard, a daughter of Duke John I of Mecklenburg-Stargard.  They had three children:
 Barnim VI, Duke of Pomerania
 Wartislaw VIII, Duke of Pomerania
 Sophie, married Henry the Mild, Duke of Brunswick-Lüneburg

Ancestors

External links 
 Genealogy mittelalter.de

Pomeranian nobility
1345 births
1394 deaths
14th-century German nobility